In epidemiology and biomedicine, biological plausibility is the proposal of a causal association—a relationship between a putative cause and an outcome—that is consistent with existing biological and medical knowledge.

Biological plausibility is one component of a method of reasoning that can establish a cause-and-effect relationship between a biological factor and a particular disease or adverse event. It is also an important part of the process of evaluating whether a proposed therapy (drug, vaccine, surgical procedure, etc.) has a real benefit to a patient. This concept has application to many controversial public affairs debates, such as that over the causes of adverse vaccination outcomes.

Biological plausibility is an essential element of the intellectual background of epidemiology. The term originated in the seminal work of determining the causality of smoking-related disease (The Surgeon General's Advisory Committee on Smoking and Health [1964]).

Applications

Disease and adverse event causality
It is generally agreed that to be considered "causal", the association between a biological factor and a disease (or other bad outcome) should be biologically coherent. That is to say, it should be plausible and explicable biologically according to the known facts of the natural history and biology of the disease in question.

Other important criteria in evaluations of disease and adverse event causality include consistency, strength of association, specificity and a meaningful temporal relationship. These are known collectively as the Bradford-Hill criteria, after the great English epidemiologist who proposed them in 1965. However, Austin Bradford Hill himself de-emphasized "plausibility" among the other criteria:

Treatment outcomes
The preliminary research leading up to a randomized clinical trial (RCT) of a drug or biologic has been termed "plausibility building". This involves the gathering and analysis of biochemical, tissue or animal data which are eventually found to point to a mechanism of action or to demonstrate the desired biological effect. This process is said to confer biological plausibility. Since large, definitive RCTs are extremely expensive and labor-intensive, only sufficiently promising therapies are thought to merit the attention and effort of final confirmation (or refutation) in them.

In distinction to biological plausibility, clinical data from epidemiological studies, case reports, case series and small, formal open or controlled clinical trials may confer clinical plausibility. According to the strictest criteria, a therapy is sufficiently scientifically plausible to merit the time and expense of definitive testing only if it is either biologically or clinically plausible.  It has been observed that, despite its importance, biological plausibility is lacking for most complementary and alternative medicine  therapies.

References

Epidemiology
Clinical trials